The Tabai River is a river in northern part of Western Papua, Papua province, Indonesia.

Geography
The river flows in the northern area of Papua with predominantly tropical rainforest climate (designated as Af in the Köppen-Geiger climate classification). The annual average temperature in the area is 22 °C. The warmest month is August, when the average temperature is around 24 °C, and the coldest is September, at 20 °C. The average annual rainfall is 5543 mm. The wettest month is April, with an average of 550 mm rainfall, and the driest is January, with 263 mm rainfall.

See also
List of rivers of Indonesia
List of rivers of Western New Guinea

References

Rivers of Central Papua
Rivers of Indonesia